The Iran and Iraq national football teams are sporting rivals since 1962.

According to The Malay Mail, "Emotions are always high when Iran and Iraq meet on the football pitch".

The most recent match between the two teams was in World Cup qualifier on 27 January 2022 hosted in Iran, where Iran won the game by 0–1.

Origins
The rivalry is not such a football-inspired ill-feeling between the two, but more of geography, religion, and history.
Iran and Iraq are neighboring countries, that share a long history. In the contemporary era, especially during the reign of Saddam Hussein, the two countries had bad relations and fought the Iran–Iraq War for 8 years.

In 2001, an Iran-Iraq match was not held at a neutral venue for the first time in decades.

Major tournament matches
1972 AFC Asian Cup

1976 AFC Asian Cup

1994 FIFA World Cup qualification

1996 AFC Asian Cup

2000 AFC Asian Cup

2002 FIFA World Cup qualification

2002 FIFA World Cup qualification

2011 AFC Asian Cup

2015 AFC Asian Cup

2019 AFC Asian Cup

2022 FIFA World Cup qualification

2022 FIFA World Cup qualification

2022 FIFA World Cup qualification

2022 FIFA World Cup qualification

Matches
Source:

Statistics

Overall

Top scorers

See also
Iran–Saudi Arabia football rivalry
Iraq–Saudi Arabia football rivalry

References

International association football rivalries
Iran national football team rivalries
Iraq national football team
Iran–Iraq relations
1962 establishments in Asia
Politics and sports